Andrej Martin and Hans Podlipnik were the defending champions but chose not to participate.

Jonathan Eysseric and André Ghem won the title after defeating Ariel Behar and Dino Marcan 6–0, 6–4 in the final.

Seeds

Draw

References
 Main Draw

Svijany Open - Doubles